Sripur Halt railway station is a halt railway station on the Howrah–New Jalpaiguri line of Katihar railway division of Northeast Frontier Railway Zone. It is situated at Ballabhpur, Sripur of Malda district in the Indian state of West Bengal. Total 10 passenger trains stop at Sripur Halt railway station.

References

Railway stations in Malda district
Katihar railway division